Tavsiye (Advice) is the sixth studio album by Turkish-Belgian singer Hadise. It was released on 4 August 2014 by Pasaj Müzik. When questioned about the title of the album Hadise said that she had a song with the same title and she felt that the collection of songs on the album contained advice for women, hence she chose this title. The lead single, "Nerdesin Aşkım", was titled based on a sentence used by Cem Yılmaz in CM101MMXI Fundamentals, which was used in the chorus of the song ("Nerdesin aşkım? Burdayım aşkım! (Where are you my love? I'm here my love!)"). The music and lyrics of the song were provided by Alper Narman and Onur Özdemir, the arrangement was done by İskender Paydaş, and Hülya Açıkgöz directed the music video, which was released on 31 July 2014. The second single from the album was "Prenses". This music video was also directed by Hülya Açıkgöz. Music videos for the songs "Yaz Günü" and "Bu Aralar" were released in 2015 and 2016 respectively, the latter of which was shot in Dominican Republic. "Nerdesin Aşkım?" and "Bu Aralar" both ranked first on Turkey's official music chart.

Track listing

Personnel 
 Production: Pasaj Müzik
 Producers: Hadise Açıkgöz, Hülya Açıkgöz
 General Coordinator: Hülya Açıkgöz
 Supervisor: İskender Paydaş
 Musical Assistant: Bilge Miraç Atıcı
 Vocal Coach: Youssef Chellak
 Vocal Recording: Barış Erduran
 Photographs: Emre Ünal
 Style Consultant: Derya Açıkgöz
 Hair Stylist: Serkan Aktürk
 Make-up: Ali Rıza Özdemir
 Nail Art: Ebru Pırıl
 Design: Erhan Karadeniz
 Printing: Frs

Sales

References

External links 
Hadise official website

2014 albums
Hadise albums